Euriphene lysandra, the Lysandra nymph, is a butterfly in the family Nymphalidae. It is found in southern Nigeria, Cameroon, Equatorial Guinea, Gabon, the Republic of the Congo and the Democratic Republic of the Congo (Moyen-Congo and Mayumbe). The habitat consists of forests.

The larvae feed on Dichapetalum species.

References

Butterflies described in 1790
Euriphene